The Lost Boy is the debut studio album by American rapper Cordae (then known as YBN Cordae). The album was released on July 26, 2019, by Atlantic Records and Art@War, and contains features from Chance the Rapper, Anderson .Paak, Ty Dolla Sign, Pusha T, Arin Ray, and Meek Mill. The album has received widespread acclaim from music critics. The album was later nominated for Best Rap Album at the 2020 Grammy Awards, while the album track "Bad Idea" was nominated a Grammy Award for Best Rap Song.

The Lost Boy was supported by three singles, "Have Mercy", "Bad Idea", and "RNP".

Release and promotion
The album's lead single, "Have Mercy", was released on March 8, 2019. Two music videos for "Have Mercy" were released on April 16, 2019, with the first one being directed by Cole Bennett and the other being directed by Aplus. The single was produced by Flippa, Kid Culture, and Nils.

The album's second single, "Bad Idea", was released on June 17, 2019, along with an accompanied music video and features vocals from American rapper Chance the Rapper. The single was produced by Bongo ByTheWay with co-production by Kid Culture.

The album's third single, "RNP", was released on July 23, 2019, and features vocals from American singer Anderson .Paak. The single was produced by J. Cole. The music video was released on October 14.

The music video for "Broke As Fuck", was released on August 15, 2019.

Critical reception

The Lost Boy received widespread acclaim from critics. At Metacritic, which assigns a normalized rating out of 100 to reviews from mainstream publications, the album received an average score of 81, based on five reviews. Fred Thomas of AllMusic said, "The rapper's skills aren't in question on The Lost Boy, but the album sometimes overshoots in its ambition, aiming for too many styles to hit them all with excellence. It's still a strong collection, and when Cordae strikes a perfect balance of mellow production and lyrical power on standout tracks like "We Gon Make It," it points to even more fully formed work ahead from a strong talent just getting started." Nicolas Tyrell of Clash stated "Both bold and filled with bravado, yet layered and emotional, YBN Cordae is able to convey his desires, hopes, and fears in an ambitious and well-thought out format. A strong debut from an artist who knows that he is capable of long-term success."

Jacob Carey of Exclaim! said, "If The Lost Boy was the new wave rapper's most substantial test of talent and longevity, YBN Cordae passed with flying colours." Scott Glaysher of HipHopDX stated "Encapsulates everything a Gen Z rapper should be aiming for; young gun energy mixed with traditional skill." Will Schube of Pitchfork said, "Despite the glossy guestlist, The Lost Boy remains Cordae’s show. At 15 songs, it could have used an edit, another voice in the room telling him to tone it down. But still, it’s an assured debut." Tom Hull ranked it 52nd on his list of the best non-jazz albums from 2019.

Commercial performance
The Lost Boy debuted at number 13 on the Billboard 200, with 25.000 copies moved in its first week for the chart dated August 10, 2019. The album also debuted on the Top R&B/Hip-Hop Albums chart at number eight.

Track listing
Credits adapted from Tidal.

Notes
  signifies a co-producer
 "Wintertime" features vocals by Quincy Jones and additional vocals by PJ
 "Sweet Lawd (Skit)" and "Grandma's House (Skit)" features additional vocals by Arin Ray, Masego and SiR
 "Bad Idea" features additional vocals by Ant Clemons and SiR
 "Thanksgiving" features background vocals by SiR
 "Broke As Fuck" features background vocals by Jehreeus Banks
 "Thousand Words" features background vocals by Syd
 "Been Around" features background vocals by Hasani and vocals by Quincy Jones
 "Family Matters" features additional vocals by ThePpl

Personnel
Credits adapted from Tidal.

Instrumentation
 Aliandro Prawl – keyboards 
 Amanda Bailey – strings 
 Tarron Crayton – bass 
 Kid Culture – programming 
 Karim "Kace" Hutton – bass 
 Justin Zim – bass 
 Freaky Rob – guitar 
 illuid.haller – piano 
 G Koop – guitar 
 Raymond Komba – piano 

Technical
 Brendan "Bren" Ferry – recording 
 Pedro Calloni – recording 
 Juro "Mez" Davis – recording 
 Take a Daytrip – recording 
 Cyrus "NOIS" Taghipour – mixing 
 Derek "MixedByAli" Ali – mixing 
 Aria "Angel" Ali – mixing 
 Dave Kutch – mastering 
 Zachary Acosta – engineering assistant , mixing 
 Curtis "Sircut" Bye – engineering assistant

Charts

References

2019 debut albums
Cordae albums
Atlantic Records albums
Albums produced by Terrace Martin
Albums produced by J. Cole
Albums produced by Take a Daytrip
Albums produced by Cardiak
Neo soul albums